= The Berlin Lioness Hunt =

The Berlin Lioness Hunt was an unsuccessful hunt for a hitherto unidentified game animal, initially thought to be a lioness, in and around Berlin, the capital of Germany, in the second half of July 2023.
